Mattia Pitzalis (born 4 April 2000) is an Italian professional footballer who plays as a defender.

Club career
Following the loan in the 2018–19 season, on 17 July 2019 he moved to Olbia on a permanent basis, signing a 3-year contract.

On 1 February 2021, he joined Turris on loan.

On 22 July 2021, he joined permanently to Legnago Salus.

References

External links

2000 births
Living people
Sportspeople from Cagliari
Footballers from Sardinia
Italian footballers
Association football defenders
Serie C players
Cagliari Calcio players
Olbia Calcio 1905 players
S.S. Turris Calcio players
F.C. Legnago Salus players